Maruti Indian Restaurant, or simply Maruti, is an Indian restaurant in Portland, Oregon.

Description 
Maruti is a vegetarian restaurant serving Indian cuisine on Hawthorne Boulevard in southeast Portland's Buckman neighborhood. The menu has included biryani and tikka masala.

History 

Rudra Parmar and chef Falguni Khanna opened Maruti in Portland on November 12, 2016, in a space which previously housed Bombay Cricket Club. Previously, Maruti operated in Mount Shasta, California for approximately two years. According to the Portland Mercury Isabella Garcia, Maruti offers "Indian staples with an emphasis on sustainability" and uses "organic, non-GMO, and sustainably sourced ingredients and materials throughout the restaurant".

Reception 
Maruti has been included in several Eater Portland lists, including Michelle DeVona's 2018 overview of recommended eateries in the Hawthorne District, Waz Wu's 2021 overview of "Where to Find Standout Vegan Curries in Portland", and Ron Scott's 2021 list of "Where to Find Exceptional Indian Food in Portland". Additionally, Jenni Moore recommended the Baingan Bharta in a 2020 list of "13 Standout Vegetarian Meals in Portland", and Wu included the restaurant in a 2023 list of "Portland’s Primo Special Occasion Restaurants for Vegans and Vegetarians".

In 2017, Willamette Week Matthew Korfhage included Murati in a list of "The Best Restaurants on Hawthorne and Belmont in Southeast Portland". The newspaper also said in 2019, "for vegans and vegetarians, this place is like a gift from Vishnu".

See also

 List of Indian restaurants

References

External links 

 
 Maruti Indian Restaurant at Zomato

Asian restaurants in Portland, Oregon
Buckman, Portland, Oregon
Indian restaurants in Oregon
Indian-American culture in California
Indian-American culture in Portland, Oregon
Mount Shasta, California (city)